The All American Trio (also released as Cedar Walton/Ron Carter/Jack DeJohnette) is an album by pianist Cedar Walton, bassist Ron Carter and Drummer Jack DeJohnette recorded in 1983 and first released on the Japanese Baystate label.

Reception

Allmusic awarded the album 3 stars. The Penguin Guide to Jazz highlighted DeJohnette's musical progress since his 1968 recordings with Walton, and commented that "all three players are intuitively musical in approach".

Track listing 
All compositions by Cedar Walton except as indicated
 "Iron Clad" – 5:52
 "Alone Together" (Howard Dietz, Arthur Schwartz) – 6:37
 "Blue Heart" (Benny Golson) – 5:05
 "Ebony" (Jack DeJohnette) – 5:21
 "All the Things You Are" (Jerome Kern, Oscar Hammerstein II) – 6:09
 "A Slight Smile" (Ron Carter) – 5:07
 "The Rubber Man" – 6:24
 "B and A" (Carter) – 4:44

Personnel 
Cedar Walton – piano
Ron Carter – bass
Jack DeJohnette – drums

References 

Cedar Walton albums
Ron Carter albums
Jack DeJohnette albums
1984 albums
Baystate Records albums